The Applied Genetic Technologies Corporation is a publicly traded biotechnology company that is part of the NASDAQ Biotechnology Index. It was founded in 1999 and has its headquarters in Alachua, Florida. In late June 2019, the company announced the appointment of Global Clinical and Medical Affairs Veteran, Theresa G.H. Heah, M.D., M.B.A., to Join as Chief Medical Officer.

The company focuses on ophthalmologic genetic diseases. The company's technologies are aimed at products that might have the potential to treat   achromatopsia, X-linked retinoschisis, X-linked retinitis pigmentosa, and age-related macular degeneration.  The company has six products in various stages of development; as of 2016, none had yet been approved.

In January 2017, AGTC entered into a strategic research and development collaboration with Bionic Sight, an innovator in the emerging field of optogenetics and retinal coding. Through the collaboration, AGTC and Bionic Sight will to develop a new optogenetic therapy that leverages AGTC's deep experience in gene therapy and ophthalmology.

On January 9, 2020, the company reported positive results from a Phase 1/2 trial for its investigational gene therapy for retinitis pigmentosa. A few weeks later, the company reported interim six-month data from the dose-escalation cohorts of its ongoing Phase 1/2 clinical programs in patients with achromatopsia due to mutation in the ACHM CNGB3 or ACHM CNGA3 genes. Applied Genetic Technologies Corporation is a patient partner within the blinding eye disease and rare disease community, including organizations like Foundation for Fighting Blindness and Global Genes.

References

External links
 Official website
 

Ophthalmology organizations
Biotechnology companies established in 1999
1999 establishments in Florida
Companies listed on the Nasdaq